African Herbsman is a 1973 Trojan Records repackage of Bob Marley and the Wailers' 1971 album Soul Revolution Part II produced by Lee "Scratch" Perry, which had had a limited Jamaica only release. African Herbsman was released shortly after the band's major-label debut album Catch a Fire had been released by Island Records.

The album differs from  Soul Revolution Part II by adding five other tracks from the period. Four of the added tracks are non-album singles, including two of the group's self-productions, "Trenchtown Rock" and "Lively Up Yourself", as well as "400 Years" by Peter Tosh from the album Soul Rebels.

Several of the songs would later be re-recorded by Marley for his later albums; examples are "Lively Up Yourself" (on Natty Dread), "Duppy Conqueror", "Put It On" and "Small Axe" (on Burnin'), and "Sun Is Shining" (on Kaya).

Track listing

Original album (1973)
All tracks written by Bob Marley, unless noted.

Trojan Records reissue (2003)

References

Bob Marley and the Wailers compilation albums
1973 compilation albums
Albums produced by Lee "Scratch" Perry
Trojan Records albums